Clarence Rost (March 9, 1914 – August 7, 2008) was a Canadian professional ice hockey player. Known by the nickname 'Sonny' he played between 1935 and 1958 for the Wembley Monarchs and the Wembley Lions in the English National League and the British National League. He was inducted to the British Ice Hockey Hall of Fame in 1955.

Rost is the father of fellow British Ice Hockey Hall of Famer John Rost.

External links
British Ice Hockey Hall of Fame entry

a-z of ice hockey
BBC Sport 2004 interview

1914 births
2008 deaths
British Ice Hockey Hall of Fame inductees
Canadian ice hockey defencemen
Ice hockey people from Winnipeg
Wembley Lions players
Wembley Monarchs players
Canadian expatriate ice hockey players in England